The Institute of Environmental Sciences and Engineering is located at Rawalpindi, Punjab, Pakistan. It is affiliated with the National University of Sciences and Technology. It is a teaching and research institute offering MS and PhD programs in Environmental Engineering, consultancy, and testing services for the public and private sectors.

Facilities 
A separate building of IESE is in NUST campus at H-12 sector Islamabad and comprises an auditorium, class rooms, research labs, computer lab, conference room, library and faculty offices.

IT and computing
The new campus at H-12 Islamabad has a trunk fiber link centrally connected with all other schools and HQ-NUST. Secure LAN, WAN and wireless infrastructure is available to access high speed internet.

Research labs
Research labs in the institute include Microbiology Lab, Chemistry Lab, Instrumentation Lab and Computer Lab.

Library and Information Resource Centre (LIRC) 
The library has course books, encyclopedias, journals, newspapers and full text databases through the HEC digital library.

External links
National University of Science and Technology

National University of Sciences & Technology
Engineering universities and colleges in Pakistan
Universities and colleges in Rawalpindi District